is a professional Japanese baseball player. He plays pitcher for the Hokkaido Nippon-Ham Fighters.

External links

 NPB.com

1992 births
Living people
People from Minamibōsō
Japanese baseball players
Nippon Professional Baseball pitchers
Hokkaido Nippon-Ham Fighters players
Baseball people from Chiba Prefecture
Asian Games medalists in baseball
Baseball players at the 2014 Asian Games
Medalists at the 2014 Asian Games
Asian Games bronze medalists for Japan